Petr Bendl (born 24 January 1966) is a Czech politician, who served as Minister of Agriculture from October 2011 to July 2013 in Cabinet of Prime Minister Petr Nečas and briefly as Minister of Transport under leadership of Prime Minister Mirek Topolánek. Bendl is a former governor of the Central Bohemian Region after serving two terms. He was  Member of the Chamber of Deputies (MP) between 2010 and 2017.

Bendl is a graduate at Engineering and Textile University in Liberec. After a short spell as firefighter, he worked as director of Kladno district office and municipal office's departments.

In 1991 Bendl entered the Civic Democratic Party and as the party's leader he was elected member of the Kladno city assembly in 1994 becoming mayor of the city immediately.

Bendl was also vice-president of the Union of Cities and Municipalities of the Czech Republic in 1997–1998.

In 1998 he was elected into the Chamber of Deputies of the Czech Republic (resigned in 2001 due to his regional career) as well into the Kladno assembly and was thus replaced by Milan Volf as the new Kladno mayor, staying only in the city council until 2000.

In 2000 he was elected in the Central Bohemian Region assembly and became first Governor of the region. He defended his seat successfully in 2004.

Bendl is married and has two sons - Tomáš and Daniel.

References

 Bendl Petr, Ing. - politik in Třeštík, Michael (ed.): Kdo je kdo. Osobnosti české současnosti. Agentura Kdo je kdo, Praha 2005, p. 35.

External links
 Personal website of Petr Bendl 
 Petr Bendl on website of the Civic Democratic Party 

1966 births
Living people
Agriculture ministers of the Czech Republic
Transport ministers of the Czech Republic
Politicians from Kladno
Civic Democratic Party (Czech Republic) MPs
Mayors of places in the Czech Republic
Civic Democratic Party (Czech Republic) governors
Civic Democratic Party (Czech Republic) Government ministers
Civic Democratic Party (Czech Republic) mayors
Members of the Chamber of Deputies of the Czech Republic (2013–2017)
Members of the Chamber of Deputies of the Czech Republic (2010–2013)
Members of the Chamber of Deputies of the Czech Republic (1998–2002)
Members of the Chamber of Deputies of the Czech Republic (2017–2021)
Members of the Chamber of Deputies of the Czech Republic (2021–2025)
Technical University of Liberec alumni